Giovanni "Pupo" De Luca (18 December 1924 – 18 December 2006) was an Italian  actor and jazz musician.

Life and career 
Born in Milan, after the World War II De Luca started his career in the theaters of his hometown, performing in revues,  dialect theatre, and dramas. He had his breakout in the late 1960s, with the role of Fritz in the RAI TV-series Nero Wolfe. In films, he was mainly active as a character actor, except for a number of main roles in a few low budget comedies.

De Luca was also well known as a jazz drummer, and his collaborations include Chet Baker, Franco Cerri, Enrico Intra, Bud Shank, and Gianni Basso. With Intra and Gianni Buongiovanni he is considered a "founding father" of the cabaret Derby Club in his hometown.

De Luca retired from showbusiness in the early 1990s and moved to Lanzarote, Canary Islands, where he died in 2006, aged 82 years old.

Filmography

References

External links
 

1924 births
2006 deaths
Italian male film actors
Italian male stage actors
Italian male television actors
Musicians from Milan
Italian jazz drummers
Male drummers
Male jazz musicians
Male actors from Milan
20th-century Italian male musicians
Italian expatriates in Spain